In enzymology, a coniferyl-aldehyde dehydrogenase is an enzyme that catalyzes the chemical reaction

coniferyl aldehyde + H2O + NAD(P)+  ferulate + NAD(P)H + 2 H+

The 4 substrates of this enzyme are coniferyl aldehyde, H2O, NAD+, and NADP+, whereas its 4 products are ferulate, NADH, NADPH, and H+.

This enzyme belongs to the family of oxidoreductases, specifically those acting on the aldehyde or oxo group of donor with NAD+ or NADP+ as acceptor.  The systematic name of this enzyme class is coniferyl aldehyde:NAD(P)+ oxidoreductase.

References

 

EC 1.2.1
NADPH-dependent enzymes
NADH-dependent enzymes
Enzymes of unknown structure